Dudley Griffin Wilkins (November 11, 1914 – February 1989) was an American triple jumper. He was United States champion in 1934 and placed eighth at the 1936 Summer Olympics.

Biography

Wilkins was born in Crowley, Louisiana on November 11, 1914. He won the Amateur Athletic Union (AAU) national triple jump championship in 1934 with a jump of 48 ft  in (14.69 m). At the 1936 Olympic Trials Wilkins placed second with 49 ft  in (14.97 m), qualifying for the American team together with Rolland Romero and Billy Brown; all three were from Louisiana, which had been America's leading triple jump state since the late 1920s. At the Olympics in Berlin Wilkins placed eighth, reaching 14.83 m (48 ft  in) in both the first and the third round and fouling in round two; he did not qualify for the last three rounds.

Wilkins set his personal best, 49 ft 9 in (15.16 m), in Baton Rouge on May 4, 1935. He died in Crowley in February 1989.

References

1914 births
1989 deaths
People from Crowley, Louisiana
American male triple jumpers
Athletes (track and field) at the 1936 Summer Olympics
Olympic track and field athletes of the United States